Ian D. Thatcher is a scholar of Russia.

Selected works 

 Journal of Trotsky Studies (1993–)
 Leon Trotsky and World War One, August 1914–February 1917 (2000)
 Trotsky (2003)

References

External links 
 

Historians of Russia
Living people

Year of birth missing (living people)